The canton of Mauléon is an administrative division of the Deux-Sèvres department, western France. Its borders were modified at the French canton reorganisation which came into effect in March 2015. Its seat is in Mauléon.

It consists of the following communes:
 
Argentonnay
Genneton
Mauléon
Nueil-les-Aubiers
La Petite-Boissière
Saint-Amand-sur-Sèvre
Saint-Aubin-du-Plain
Saint-Maurice-Étusson
Saint-Pierre-des-Échaubrognes
Voulmentin

References

Cantons of Deux-Sèvres